, born  on 11 June 1928, is the eldest daughter of Nobusuke Kishi, the widow of Shintaro Abe and the mother of Hironobu, Shinzo Abe and Nobuo Kishi. She is also known as a calligrapher. She is like the "God Mother" of the Kishi-Abe family (a Japanese political family for three generations), had long been the leader of the wives of members of Seiwa Seisaku Kenkyūkai, and is called the "God Mother of the World of Politics" because she has many followers in politics.

Works 

 『わたしの安倍晋太郎：岸信介の娘として』（ネスコ、1992年）

Honors  

 Order of Saints Maurice and Lazarus

References 

Spouses of Japanese politicians
Shinzo Abe
Recipients of the Order of Saints Maurice and Lazarus
People from Tokyo
1928 births
Living people
Parents of prime ministers of Japan